Sexual Chronicles of a French Family is a 2012 French sex comedy film directed by Jean-Marc Barr and Pascal Arnold.

Premise
After youngest son Romain is caught filming himself masturbating in class, his mother Claire rounds up the family to talk about their sexual experiences.

Cast
 Mathias Melloul as Romain
 Valérie Maës as Claire
 Stephen Hersoen as Hervé, Romain's father and Claire's husband
 Nathan Duval as Pierre, Romain's older brother
 Leila Denio as Marie, Romain and Pierre's adopted sister
 Yan Brian as Michel
 Adeline Rebeillard as Coralie, Romain's friend
 Grégory Annoni as Cédric
 Laëtitia Favart as Nathalie
 Philippe Duquesne as the school director

Release
The original French release contains extremely explicit sex scenes and nudity featuring pornography actress Leïla Denio, Faustine Dubois, and Lola Bruna (Mailys Amrous). The version released in North America omits much of the explicit sex and nudity.

Reception
The film received negative reviews, currently holding a 0% rating on review aggregator website Rotten Tomatoes based on 5 reviews, with an average score of 3.1/10. On Metacritic, based on 5 critics, the film has a 34/100 rating, indicating "generally unfavorable reviews".

References

External links
 
 
 

2012 films
2012 comedy-drama films
2012 LGBT-related films
2010s coming-of-age comedy-drama films
2010s French-language films
2010s sex comedy films
Bisexuality-related films
Films about dysfunctional families
Films set in France
Films shot in France
French coming-of-age comedy-drama films
French LGBT-related films
French independent films
French sex comedy films
LGBT-related comedy-drama films
LGBT-related coming-of-age films
LGBT-related sex comedy films
2010s French films